Estrazinol (INN), or as estrazinol hydrobromide (USAN) (developmental code name W-4454A), also known as 3-methoxy-8-aza-19-norpregna-1,3,5(10)-trien-20-yn-17-ol, is a synthetic, steroidal estrogen that was synthesized in 1968 and further characterized in 1973 but was never marketed. It is described as a water-soluble estrogen.

References

Estranes
Synthetic estrogens